Laura La Plante (born Laura Laplante; November 1, 1904 – October 14, 1996) was an American film actress, whose more notable performances were in the silent era.

Early life
La Plante was born in St. Louis, Missouri on November 1, 1904, the daughter of William A. Laplante and Elizabeth E. Turk. Her father taught dancing. After her parents were divorced, her mother took Laura and her sister Violet to live in San Diego, California. In her teens, Laura stayed with Mary MacMahon, her cousin, in Hollywood during a summer vacation and replied to a newspaper ad asking for children for moving pictures, and she was hired.

Silent film career
La Plante made her acting debut at age 15, and in 1923, she was named as one of that year's WAMPAS Baby Stars. During the 1920s, she appeared in more than 60 films. Her early films include Big Town Round-Up (1921), with cowboy star Tom Mix, the serials Perils of the Yukon (1922), Around the World in Eighteen Days (1923), and several movies with Hoot Gibson.

The majority of the films starring La Plante (from 1921 to 1930) were made for Universal Pictures. During this period, she was the studio's most popular star, "an accomplishment duplicated only by Deanna Durbin years later", and almost always enjoyed top billing.

One of La Plante's early surviving films is the 1925 film Smouldering Fires, directed by Clarence Brown and costarring Pauline Frederick. Her best-remembered film is arguably the silent classic The Cat and the Canary (1927), but she achieved acclaim for Skinner's Dress Suit (1926), with Reginald Denny, the part-sound The Love Trap (1929), directed by William Wyler, and the 1929 part-sound Show Boat (1929), adapted from the novel of the same name by Edna Ferber.

Although this last film was an adaptation of the novel, and not of the famous musical play adapted from the 1926 novel, some songs from the play were included in the film as box-office insurance. She did not sing in the movie; her singing was dubbed by Eva Olivetti, one of the early examples in which this was done in a movie. A scene of La Plante in Show Boat was broadcast in the early days of British television.

Transition to sound films
The advent of sound films effectively shortened her career. In her mid-20s, La Plante was a natural and appealing presence in early sound films, but the huge wave of new stars in these years overshadowed her. She made her last appearances for Universal in the Technicolor musical  King of Jazz (1930). She appeared in God's Gift to Women (Warner Bros., 1931), directed by Michael Curtiz and co-starring Frank Fay and Joan Blondell, and Arizona (Columbia, 1931), co-starring alongside a young John Wayne.

Later career
La Plante went to Britain to work at Warner Brothers' Teddington Studios. The company had faced criticism for the low quality of its "quota quickies", and her arrival coincided with an attempt to make expensive productions. She starred in Man of the Moment (1935), with Douglas Fairbanks, Jr. She appeared in the West End playing the lead in Ian Hay's Admirals All. La Plante briefly was considered to replace Myrna Loy in the Thin Man when Loy thought about leaving series, but Loy stayed as Nora Charles, and La Plante's career never rebounded. She retired from the screen in 1935, making only two later films, and 1957's Spring Reunion was her last. Her younger sister, actress Violet, never achieved Laura's level of fame; both sisters were WAMPAS Baby Stars.

On June 3, 1954 (Season 4 Episode 38), La Plante made a guest appearance (as herself, Mrs. Laura Asher) on Groucho Marx's quiz show You Bet Your Life. In this episode, La Plante discussed numerous topics, including her husband Irving Asher, who had just lost 25 lbs. and completed the film Elephant Walk with Elizabeth Taylor. Mrs. Asher asked that her winnings, if any, go to the Motion Picture Relief Fund. They got three out of four questions correct to win $215. In the mid-1980s, La Plante was brought on stage in a wheelchair to wave to the crowd at the event Night of a Hundred Stars.

Death
La Plante died on October 14, 1996 at the age of 91 in Woodland Hills, California. Her death was due to Alzheimer's disease. Despite contrary belief about her rumored interment at El Camino Memorial Park in San Diego, California, La Plante was actually cremated by Valhalla Memorial Park Cemetery in North Hollywood, California, and her ashes scattered at sea.

Legacy
 Laura La Plante Drive in Agoura Hills, California

Filmography

See also
 Silent films

References

External links

Laura La Plante(NY Public Library, Billy Rose collection)
Laura La Plante at Virtual History

1904 births
1996 deaths
20th-century American actresses
Actresses from St. Louis
American film actresses
American silent film actresses
Deaths from dementia in California
Deaths from Alzheimer's disease
WAMPAS Baby Stars